René Persillon (16 June 1919 – 27 July 1997) was a French footballer. He competed at the 1948 Summer Olympics and the 1952 Summer Olympics.

References

External links
 

1919 births
1997 deaths
French footballers
Olympic footballers of France
Footballers at the 1948 Summer Olympics
Footballers at the 1952 Summer Olympics
Sportspeople from Gironde
Association football midfielders
Footballers from Nouvelle-Aquitaine
20th-century French people